Barrallton is an unincorporated community located in Bullitt County, Kentucky, United States.  It was also known as Sunnyside.

History
A post office was established at Barrallton in 1885, and remained in operation until 1942. John Alden Barrall served as the first postmaster, and probably gave the community its name.

References

Unincorporated communities in Bullitt County, Kentucky
Unincorporated communities in Kentucky